Garscadden is a district of Glasgow.

Garscadden may also refer to:

Garscadden Wood, nature reserve
Glasgow Garscadden (UK Parliament constituency)
Kathleen Garscadden (1897–1991), Scottish radio presenter
Garscadden railway station